A sundae is an ice cream dessert of American origin that typically consists of one or more scoops of ice cream topped with sauce or syrup and other toppings such as sprinkles, whipped cream, marshmallows, peanuts, maraschino cherries, or other fruits (e.g. bananas and pineapple in a banana split).

According to the Online Etymology Dictionary, the origin of the term sundae is obscure.

History

Among the many stories about the invention of the sundae, a frequent theme is that the ice cream sundae was a variation of the popular ice cream soda.   According to an account published by the Evanston Public Library (Illinois), the sale of soda was prohibited on Sundays in Illinois because they were considered too "frilly". Other origin stories for the sundae focus on the novelty or inventiveness of the treat or the name of the originator and make no mention of legal pressures.

The ice cream sundae soon became the weekend semi-official soda fountain confection at the beginning of the 1900s and quickly gained popularity. The Ice Cream Trade Journal for 1909 listed, along with plain, or French sundae,  such unique varieties as Robin Hood sundae, Cocoa Caramel sundae, Black Hawk sundae, Angel Cake sundae, Cherry Dip sundae, Cinnamon Peak sundae, Opera sundae, Fleur D'Orange sundae, Knickerbocker sundae, Tally-Ho Sundae, Bismarck and George Washington sundaes, to name a few.

In 2019, McDonald's Portugal promoted a sundae for Halloween with advertising that dubbed it "Sundae Bloody Sundae". This generated controversy on social networks in the British-Irish territories due to the name's connotation with the Bloody Sunday massacre in 1972. McDonald's issued an apology and withdrew promotions with the name.

Contested origins
Various localities have claimed to be the birthplace of the ice cream sundae, including Plainfield, Illinois; New Orleans, Louisiana; Cleveland, Ohio and New York City. According to What's Cooking America, the biggest rivalry  (referred to as the "Sundae War") to claim the invention of the ice cream sundae is between Two Rivers, Wisconsin and Ithaca, New York.

Two Rivers, Wisconsin in 1881

Two Rivers claim is based on the story of George Hallauer asking Edward C. Berners, the owner of Berners' Soda Fountain, to drizzle chocolate syrup over ice cream in 1881.  Berners eventually did and wound up selling the treat for a nickel, originally only on Sundays, but later every day. According to this story, the spelling changed when a glass salesman ordered canoe-shaped dishes. When Berners died in 1939, the Chicago Tribune headlined his obituary "Man Who Made First Ice Cream Sundae Is Dead". 

Residents of Two Rivers have contested the claims of other cities to the right to claim the title "birthplace of the ice cream sundae". When Ithaca, New York, mayor Carolyn K. Peterson proclaimed a day to celebrate her city as the birthplace of the sundae, she received postcards from Two Rivers' citizens reiterating that town's claim. Berners would have only been 16 or 17 in 1881, so it is therefore "improbable" that he would have owned an ice cream shop in that year. They also state that the obituary dates Berners' first sundae to 1899 rather than 1881.

Buffalo, New York in 1889
Buffalos Stoddart Bros. Drug Store advertised serving up ice cream sodas garnished with fruit syrup and whipped cream in the pages of The Buffalo Evening News and the Buffalo Courier as early as 1889.

Evanston, Illinois in 1890
Evanston was one of the first locations to pass a blue law against selling ice cream sodas in 1890. "Some ingenious confectioners and drug store operators [in Evanston]... obeying the law, served ice cream with the syrup of your choice without the soda [on Sundays]. Thereby complying with the law…  This sodaless soda was the Sunday soda." As sales of the dessert continued on Mondays, local Methodist leaders then objected to naming the dish after the Sabbath, so the spelling of the name was changed to sundae.

Ithaca, New York in 1892

Supporting Ithacas claim to be "the birthplace of the ice cream sundae", researchers at The History Center in Tompkins County, New York, provide an account of how the sundae came to be: On Sunday, April 3, 1892, in Ithaca, John M. Scott, a Unitarian Church minister, and Chester Platt, co-owner of Platt & Colt Pharmacy, created the first historically documented sundae. Platt covered dishes of ice cream with cherry syrup and candied cherries on a whim. The men named the dish "Cherry Sunday" in honor of the day it was created. The oldest-known written evidence of a sundae is Platt & Colt's newspaper ad for a "Cherry Sunday" placed in the Ithaca Daily Journal on April 5, 1892. By May 1892, the Platt & Colt soda fountain also served "Strawberry Sundays" and later, "Chocolate Sundays".

Platt & Colt's "Sundays" grew so popular that by 1894, Chester Platt attempted to trademark the term ice cream "Sunday".

Plainfield, Illinois
Plainfield, Illinois has also claimed to be the home of the very first ice cream sundae.  A local belief is that a Plainfield druggist named Mr. Sonntag created the dish "after the urgings of patrons to serve something different." He named it the "sonntag" after himself, and since Sonntag means Sunday in German, the name was translated to Sunday, and later was spelled sundae. Charles Sonntag established himself as a pharmacist after graduating from pharmacy school in 1890.  He worked for several years under the employ of two local druggists, Dr. David W. Jump and F. R. Tobias.  Sonntag established his own pharmacy (as early as 1893 and no later than 1895) in a building constructed in the months following a December 1891 fire that devastated one side of the town's business district.  His store advertised "Sonntag's Famous Soda" and was, likely, the first soda fountain in the Village of Plainfield.

Types

Classic ice cream sundae

The original sundae consists of vanilla ice cream topped with a flavored sauce or syrup, whipped cream, and a maraschino cherry. Classic sundaes are typically named after flavored syrup employed in the recipe: cherry sundae, chocolate sundae, strawberry sundae, raspberry sundae, etc. The classic sundae is traditionally served in a tulip-shaped, footed glass vase. Due to the long association between the shape of the glass and the dessert, this style of serving dish is generally now known as a sundae glass.

Banana split

This dessert consists of two halves of a banana, sliced lengthwise. The classic banana split consists of strawberry ice cream topped with chocolate syrup, chocolate ice cream topped with crushed pineapple, and vanilla ice cream topped with strawberry syrup. Each scoop is individually garnished with whipped cream and a maraschino cherry.

Parfait
Parfait is a sundae served in a tall glass filled with layers of ice cream or yogurt, gelatine, and flavorings such as syrups, whipped cream, granola, fresh fruit, and/or liqueurs.

Knickerbocker glory

This ice cream sundae is served in a large tall glass, consisting of layers of ice cream, jelly, fruit, and cream, topped with syrup, nuts, whipped cream, and often a cherry; it is popular in the United Kingdom.

Fruit
Sliced or chopped fruit that has been sugared and let to sit for an hour or more to form a sweet syrup may be substituted for the flavored sauce or syrup of the classic sundae. Fresh fruit sundaes include named variations such as the strawberry, peach, raspberry, blueberry, blackberry, and mixed fruit sundaes. Fresh fruit sundaes are generally served during the summer months, and they are sometimes advertised as specialty offerings in agricultural areas where particular fruits are grown.

Jarred fruit products are also available which are made specifically for the preparation of ice cream sundaes, often sweetened and in a thickened flavored juice. Sundaes can also be topped with canned fruits.

Heated-sauce
Heated-sauce sundaes are those in which the flavored sauce or syrup is heated before being poured over the ice cream, creating appealing differences in temperature as well as texture.

Hot fudge
The hot fudge sundae is a variation on the classic sundae and is often a creation of vanilla ice cream, sprinkles, hot chocolate sauce (hence the "hot fudge"), whipped cream, nuts, and a single bright-red maraschino cherry on top. The invention of this particular variant has been credited to Clarence Clifton Brown, the owner of C.C. Brown’s Ice Cream Shop in Hollywood, California, in 1906. Brown made his own fudge in copper kettles that were originally brought to the city by covered wagon, using a secret recipe that the family guarded; the store continued to prepare the fudge in these same barrels until the store's closure in 1996. It is said to have taken him two months to perfect the complete sundae.

Caramel
This is a variation of the hot fudge sundae in which heated caramel sauce replaces the heated chocolate sauce. The other ingredients remain unchanged.

Turtle
The combination of vanilla ice cream, hot fudge and hot caramel sauces, and toasted pecans is known as a turtle sundae. The name derives from the turtle candy, which consists of pecans covered with caramel and then dipped in chocolate.

Butterscotch

This is a variation of the hot fudge sundae in which butterscotch sauce replaces the heated chocolate sauce. The other ingredients remain unchanged.

Other heated sauce varieties
Occasionally, other stiff-textured sweet sauces replace the hot chocolate sauce of the classic hot fudge sundae. These novelty sundaes include the peanut butter sundae, the Nutella sundae, the hot maple syrup sundae, and others.

Black and white (Tin Roof Sundae) 
This sundae features a scoop of vanilla ice cream with chocolate sauce and a scoop of chocolate ice cream with creamy white marshmallow sauce, topped with Spanish peanuts.    The Tin Roof Sundae was created in 1916, at the Potter Drug Co., in Potter, Nebraska, owned by pharmacist James Earl Thayer.  His son, Harold Dean “Pinky” Thayer, worked in the soda fountain as a teenager and is credited for inventing the ice cream treat. According to Dr. J.E. Thayer of Sidney, there are two stories of how the sundae got its name. The first is that it was inspired by the tin ceiling in the business; the other is that the stable across the street had a tin roof and that he named it after that.  The Tin Roof Sundae can still be enjoyed in Potter, Nebraska, where the Potter Drug Co., now called the Potter Sundry, is still in operation.

Brownie sundae
This is a rich sundae made with brownies, vanilla ice cream, chocolate syrup, peanuts, hot fudge, and whipped cream, often topped with a maraschino cherry.

David Harum
This sundae consists of vanilla ice cream, crushed strawberry, crushed pineapple, whipped cream, and a cherry. It is named for the protagonist in the 1899 book David Harum; A Story of American Life.

References

External links

 The Ice Cream Sundae’s Birthplace? That’s the 64,000-Calorie Question New York Times. 6 August 2006.
 Wisconsin Historical Society ice cream marker
 Historical documents supporting Ithaca as the birthplace of the sundae